The 1951 Coupe de France Final was a football match held at Stade Olympique Yves-du-Manoir, Colombes on May 6, 1951, that saw RC Strasbourg defeat US Valenciennes-Anzin 3–0 thanks to goals by René Bihel, Raymond Krug and André Nagy.

Match details

See also
Coupe de France 1950-1951

External links
Coupe de France results at Rec.Sport.Soccer Statistics Foundation
Report on French federation site

Coupe
1951
Coupe De France Final 1951
Coupe De France Final 1951
Sport in Hauts-de-Seine
Coupe de France Final
Coupe de France Final